Dennis Patrick Casey (March 30, 1858 – January 19, 1909) was a professional baseball player who played outfielder in the Major Leagues from -. He would play for the Wilmington Quicksteps and Baltimore Orioles.  Dennis Patrick Casey is rumored to be the infamous "Casey at the Bat".

External links

1858 births
1909 deaths
Major League Baseball outfielders
Baseball players from New York (state)
Baltimore Orioles (AA) players
Wilmington Quicksteps players
19th-century baseball players
Harrisburg (minor league baseball) players
Wilmington Quicksteps (minor league) players
Hamilton Primrose players
Newark Domestics players
Newark Little Giants players
Newark Trunkmakers players
Lowell (minor league baseball) players
Hartford (minor league baseball) players
Hamilton Hams players
Montreal (minor league baseball) players
Elmira Gladiators players
Buffalo Bisons (minor league) players
Binghamton Bingoes players